"That's the Truth" is a single by Canadian country music artist Paul Brandt. Released in April 1999, it was the first single from the album of the same name. The song reached #1 on the RPM Country Tracks chart in June 1999 and #47 on the Billboard Hot Country Singles & Tracks chart.

The music video won the 2000 Canadian Country Music Association award for Video of the Year.

Chart performance

Year-end charts

References

1999 singles
Paul Brandt songs
Reprise Records singles
Songs written by Chris Farren (country musician)
Song recordings produced by Chris Farren (country musician)
1999 songs
Songs written by Paul Brandt
Canadian Country Music Association Video of the Year videos